Eucrate is a genus of crabs of the family Euryplacidae.

Species
There are currently 11 accepted species in the genus Eucrate:

 Eucrate alcocki Serène in Serène & Lohavanijaya, 1973
 Eucrate crenata (De Haan, 1835)
 Eucrate dorsalis (White, 1849)
 Eucrate formosensis Sakai, 1974
 Eucrate indica Castro & Ng, 2010
 Eucrate laevimanus (H. Lucas in Jacquinot & Lucas, 1853)
 Eucrate laevis (Borradaile, 1903)
 Eucrate sexdentata Haswell, 1881
 Eucrate solaris Yang & Sun, 1979
 Eucrate sulcatifrons (Stimpson, 1858)
 Eucrate tripunctata Campbell, 1969

References

Decapods
Crabs